Kim Kyeong-Ryang  (born 22 December 1973) is a South Korean retired footballer who played as a midfielder. He is a head coach of Jeonbuk Hyundai U-18.

References

External links 

1973 births
Living people
Association football midfielders
South Korean footballers
South Korean expatriate footballers
South Korean football managers
Jeonbuk Hyundai Motors players
Team Wellington players
K League 1 players
Expatriate association footballers in New Zealand
South Korean expatriate sportspeople in New Zealand